Adore may refer to:

Music

Albums
 Adore (album), a 1998 album by the Smashing Pumpkins
 Adore (EP), a 2015 EP by Jasmine Thompson
 Adore: Christmas Songs of Worship, a 2015 album by Chris Tomlin
 Adore, a 2005 album by Misako Odani

Songs
 "Adore" (Cashmere Cat song) (2015)
 "Adore" (Prince song) (1987)
 "Adore" (Amy Shark song) (2016)
 "Adore" (Jasmine Thompson song) (2015)
 "Adore", a 2002 song by Maus & Stolle from Radio Caroline Volume 1 by Miss Kittin
 "Adore", a 2004 song by Paco from This Is Where We Live

Other uses
 Adore (film) or Adoration (2013)

People with the name
 Adore Delano (born 1989), American drag queen
 Jett Adore (fl. from 2007), American burlesque dancer

See also

 Adoration (disambiguation)
 Renée Adorée (1898-1933), French actress
 I Adore You (disambiguation)